Robot Dreams (1986) is a collection of science fiction short stories by American writer Isaac Asimov, illustrated by Ralph McQuarrie. The title story is about Susan Calvin's discovery of a robot with rather disturbing dreams. It was written specifically for this volume and inspired by the McQuarrie cover illustration. All of the other stories had previously appeared in various other Asimov collections. Four of the stories are robot stories, while five are Multivac stories.

The companion book, which also showcases McQuarrie's illustrations (and includes Asimov essays in addition to short stories), is titled Robot Visions.

Contents

It contains a foreword by Asimov as well as the following stories:
 "Little Lost Robot" (1947), a Robot story
 "Robot Dreams" (1986), a Robot story
 "Breeds There a Man...?" (1951)
 "Hostess" (1951)
 "Sally" (1953), a Robot story
 "Strikebreaker" (1957)
 "The Machine that Won the War" (1961), a Multivac story
 "Eyes Do More Than See" (1965)
 "The Martian Way" (1952)
 "Franchise" (1955), a Multivac story
 "Jokester" (1956), a Multivac story
 "The Last Question" (1956), a Multivac story
 "Does a Bee Care?" (1957)
 "Light Verse" (1973), a Robot story
 "The Feeling of Power" (1958)
 "Spell My Name with an S" (1958)
 "The Ugly Little Boy" (1958)
 "The Billiard Ball" (1967)
 "True Love" (1977), a Multivac story
 "The Last Answer" (1980)
 "Lest We Remember" (1982)

Reception
Dave Langford reviewed Robot Dreams for White Dwarf #90, and stated that "The title story is new and quite good; the rest is familiar Asimovian reprint material."

Reviews
Review by Don D'Ammassa (1987) in Science Fiction Chronicle, #89 February 1987
Review by Nik Morton (1987) in Vector 138
Review by David V. Barrett (1987) in Vector 138
Review by Tom Easton (1987) in Analog Science Fiction/Science Fact, August 1987
Review by L. J. Hurst (1988) in Paperback Inferno, #74
Review by Ian Sales (1990) in Paperback Inferno, #82
Review by Michael Tolley (1992) in SF Commentary, #71/72

References

External links

0-441-01183-7 Robot Dreams from Google Books

1986 short story collections
American short story collections
Berkley Books books
Foundation universe books
Science fiction short story collections by Isaac Asimov
Short stories about robots